Thomas McGettrick SPS, was an Irish born missionary priest, who served as a Bishop in Nigeria.

McGettrick was born on 22 December 1905 at Killavil, Emlegh (Ballymote), Co. Sligo. He was educated at St Nathy's College in Ballaghaderreen, the diocesan college for the diocese of Achonry, he did his philosophical and theological studies at St. Patrick's College, Maynooth and was ordained in Maynooth on 22 June 1930 ordained a priest for Achonry diocese. 

He was a founding member of the Saint Patrick's Society for the Foreign Missions, (Kiltegan Fathers), which he entered in 1932, in response to appeals for priests for the missions. Fr. McGettrick volunteered for mission and was sent to Nigeria as, replacing Fr. Patrick Whitney (the societies founder) as Prefect Apostolic of Ogoja in 1939. He was appointed Bishop of Ogoja, Nigeria in 1955 serving until 1973 when the diocese was split and he was appointed the first Bishop of Abakaliki serving until 1983.

References

1905 births
1988 deaths
20th-century Irish Roman Catholic priests
Irish expatriate Catholic bishops
20th-century Roman Catholic bishops in Nigeria
Clergy from County Sligo
Alumni of St Patrick's College, Maynooth
Roman Catholic bishops of Ogoja
Roman Catholic bishops of Abakaliki